Truth, Beauty and a Picture of You is the first greatest hits album by Australian rock band The Whitlams. It was released in August 2008 and peaked at number 3 on the ARIA charts. Upon release, Tim Freedman said, "I decided to leave a couple of singles off, because I wanted to tell a story of The Whitlams in song, and I needed to put a couple of early tunes in there, and a couple of songs which were about the dramas that the band lived through, and I tried to make a nice mix between the popular songs and those that are an emotional journey."

A two disc deluxe edition includes a bonus DVD with documentaries on the making of the Love This City and Torch the Moon albums, and footage of their concerts at the Sydney Opera House in 2007 with the Sydney Symphony Orchestra. An article in The Age promoted the album's release, discussing the orchestrally-reworked Whitlams songs, the highs and lows of the band, and Freedman's young daughter Alice.

Track listing

Bonus DVD
Includes videos from The Whitlams Years DVD and footage from the Whitlams & SSO concerts.

The Stories Behind the songs interview with Tim Freedman - 19:25
Making of Love This City Doco (from the whitlam years DVD) - 15:57
Making of Torch The Moon Doco (from the whitlam years DVD) - 7:02
Where Is She from the Byron Bay Festival 1995 (from the whitlam years DVD) - 4:15
Live Performance of "Fondness Makes The Heart Grow Absent" (with SSO) - 4:18
Live Performance of "Ease of the Midnight Visit" (with SSO) - 4:57

Charts

Weekly charts

Year-end charts

Certifications

References

The Whitlams albums
2008 greatest hits albums